Mala Arayan (alternatively Malaiyarayan, the word Malai Arayan  means 'Monarch  of   the  Hills') is a member of a tribal community in parts of Kottayam, Idukki and Pattanamtitta districts of Kerala state, southern India. They are listed (Central List No - 20)  as part of Scheduled Tribes by the Government of India. Among the Scheduled Tribes, Malai Arayans out class all the other tribes in socio-economical and educational aspects. When an evaluation in the educational and employment prospect is taken, it will be found that almost all the Government Servants and other employees are coming from this faction of Scheduled Tribes.

Majority of the Population follows Hindu religion.Some of the Malai Arayans turned their religious belief from their centuries-old "Mala Daivangal" (renegades and traditional Hindus following the hereditary regulations and customs are included in this group) to Christianity, especially to Church of South India. Malai Arayans are opened to exploitation of their illiteracy and cultural uniqueness for centuries.Traditionally Malaarayans, have good moral values. Malaarayans usually practice agriculture, but most of them lost their farm land due to exploitation.

Beliefs 
Ancestors of malaarayas used to worship natural forces and their traditional gods include Malamurthi, Azhamalamurthi, Thalaparamala, Kaali and Lord Ayyappan.

Traditional Art Forms 

Traditional art forms include Ivarkali, Koladikali. Ivorkali tells the story of panchapandavas and is used to worship devi

Details
 Population: 36,000
In Kerala: 34,000
 Primary Language: Malayalam
 Religion:
 Traditional Hinduism
 Christian Adherents: 43.10%
 Evangelical:	Data not available

Sources 
 Website on the peoples of Idukki district, Kerala state

References 

Ethnic groups in India
Social groups of Kerala